Martin A. Miller is an American historian of modern Russia, psychoanalysis, and terrorism.

Selected works 

 Kropotkin (1976)
 The Russian Revolutionary Emigrés, 1825–1870 (1986)
 Freud and the Bolsheviks: Psychoanalysis in Imperial Russia and the Soviet Union (1999)
 The Foundations of Modern Terrorism (2013)

References

External links 

 

Living people
1938 births
American historians
Historians of Russia
Historians of terrorist organizations
University of Maryland, College Park alumni
University of Chicago alumni
Duke University faculty